This is a list of notable pharmaceutical companies of Bangladesh.

A

 ACI Limited
 The ACME Laboratories Ltd

B

 Beacon Pharmaceuticals
 Beximco Pharma

E

 Eskayef Pharmaceuticals Ltd.

G

 General Pharma
 GlaxoSmithKline
 Gonoshasthaya Pharma Ltd.

J

 Incepta Pharmaceuticals

N

 Novo Nordisk
 Novartis (Bangladesh) Ltd.

O

 Orion Pharma (Bangladesh)

R

 Renata Limited

S

 Sadhana Aushadhalaya
 Sanofi Bangladesh Ltd.
 Social Marketing Company
 Square Pharmaceuticals
 Sun Pharmaceuticals

References

External links 

 list of pharmaceutical companies in Bangladesh

Bangladesh
Pharmaceutical